Morgan Muise (born April 18, 1985 in Halifax, Nova Scotia) is a Canadian curler from Cochrane, Alberta.

Career
At the junior level, Muise made one appearance at the Canadian Junior Curling Championships, skipping her Nova Scotia team of Michelle Woodroffe, Amanda Sedge and Ashlee Rushton. At the 2005 Canadian Junior Curling Championships, her team finished in seventh place with a 6–6 record. New Brunswick's Andrea Kelly won the tournament and took Muise as their alternate to the 2005 World Junior Curling Championships. At the World Juniors, the Kelly rink led Canada to an 8–1 round robin record, topping the field. They then lost in the semifinal to the fourth seeded Swiss team before claiming the bronze medal with a 6–4 win over Denmark's Madeleine Dupont. Muise played in one game during the tournament, beating the Swiss Tania Grivel rink 7–6 in the round robin.

The following season, Muise replaced Lianne Sobey at lead on the Kelly rink. The team entered the 2006 New Brunswick Scott Tournament of Hearts, where they would finish round robin with a first place 6–1 record, receiving a bye to the final. They would meet veteran Heidi Hanlon in the final, where the team would win 8–7 and earn the right to represent New Brunswick at the 2006 Scott Tournament of Hearts. At the Hearts, Team Kelly finished round robin with a 5–6 record. Muise returned to Nova Scotia the next season and joined the Meaghan Smart rink at third. The team played in the 2007 Nova Scotia Scotties Tournament of Hearts, where they finished seventh with a 2–5 record. Muise moved to Alberta following the 2009–10 season and formed a new team.

In 2014, Muise and her team of Lyndsay Allen, Sarah Evans and Sara Gartner Frey won the provincial club championship and represented Alberta at the 2014 Travelers Curling Club Championship. There they finished with a 3–3 round robin record, not enough to advance to the playoffs. The team also won The Good Times Bonspiel that season, defeating Jessica Hanson in the final 9–1. Two years later, Muise returned with her same team to the 2016 Travelers Curling Club Championship where her team found success. After finishing the round robin first in their pool with a 5–1 record, the team won their semifinal matchup against Ontario 7–1 to qualify for the final. After a tight final match against Manitoba's Tracy Andries, Muise's rink would allow Manitoba to take four in the last end for an 8–5 victory. Despite the loss, the Muise rink returned once more to the 2018 Travelers Curling Club Championship and qualified for the playoffs with a 5–1 record. After wins over Manitoba and the Northwest Territories in the quarterfinal and semifinal matches, Muise would win her first national championship with a 7–3 win over Nova Scotia's Michelle Williams.

Muise joined the Mary-Anne Arsenault rink as their alternate for the 2021–22 season. They competed at the 2022 British Columbia Scotties Tournament of Hearts in Kamloops from January 5 to 9. After losing to Team Kayla MacMillan in both the A Final and 1 vs. 2 page playoff game, Team Arsenault defeated MacMillan 8–6 in the final to win the provincial championship. At the 2022 Scotties Tournament of Hearts, the team finished with a 3–5 round robin record, defeating Quebec, the Northwest Territories and the Yukon in their three victories. Muise played in one game for the team, replacing Renee Simons at lead in their victory against the Northwest Territories.

Personal life
Muise works as a bookings & programs supervisor at the Spray Lake Sawmills Family Sports Centre. She is married to Marc Gustafson.

Teams

References

External links

1985 births
Canadian women curlers
Living people
Curlers from Nova Scotia
Curlers from New Brunswick
Curlers from Alberta
Curlers from British Columbia
People from Cochrane, Alberta
Sportspeople from Halifax, Nova Scotia